This is a list of notable events in music that took place in the year 2001.

3.2 billion units were sold with a value of US$33.7 billion. DVD-Audio and Super Audio CD first rose to prominence in 2001, with approximately 600 titles available in these formats. Portable music grew in popularity after Apple Inc. released the iTunes media library on January 9 and the first iPod music player device on October 23. Worldwide, the best-selling albums were Hybrid Theory (2000) by Linkin Park, No Angel (1999) by Dido, and Survivor (2001) by Destiny's Child. The best-selling non-English album was Cieli di Toscana (2001) by Italian tenor Andrea Bocelli, which topped the charts in the Netherlands and Sweden and was the 23rd best-selling album globally.

Specific locations
2001 in British music
2001 in Norwegian music
2001 in South Korean music

Specific genres
2001 in classical music
2001 in country music
2001 in heavy metal music
2001 in hip hop music
2001 in Latin music
2001 in jazz

Events

January
January 9 – Apple Inc. introduces the iTunes media player.
January 12–21 – Rock in Rio 3 is held in Rio de Janeiro, Brazil. Headlining acts consist of Sting, R.E.M., 'N Sync, Iron Maiden, Neil Young, Red Hot Chili Peppers and a new line-up of Guns N' Roses.
January 17 – Bass player Jason Newsted leaves Metallica after 14 years with the band.
January 19–February 4 – The Big Day Out festival takes place in Australia and New Zealand, headlined by Rammstein (in all venues) and Limp Bizkit (in Auckland, the Gold Coast, and Sydney).
January 26 – A crowd crush occurs during a set by Limp Bizkit at the Sydney Big Day Out music festival. Jessica Michalik is killed and the band subsequently leaves the country after threats to their safety.

February
February 1
CFXJ (Flow 93.5), Canada's first urban music station, goes to air for the first time as a testing signal (its official debut is on March 1.) This is considered a breakthrough for Canadian hip hop and R&B musicians.
Jennifer Lopez becomes first female artist to have both a number one album (J.Lo) and a number one movie (The Wedding Planner) in the same week.
February 6 – Don Felder is fired from the Eagles. Felder sues the band for wrongful termination, and is countersued by Don Henley and Glenn Frey for breach of contract. The suits are settled out of court.
February 13 – Peter Frampton receives the Orville H. Gibson Lifetime Achievement Award.
February 17 – Manic Street Preachers become the first western rock band to play in Cuba. (Fidel Castro is in attendance.) They did not tour however, meaning that the unsigned British rock band Sandstone Veterans are the only band from the western world to tour Cuba.
February 18 – James Taylor weds for the third time, marrying Caroline "Kim" Smedvig, director of public relations and marketing for the Boston Symphony Orchestra.
February 21 – The 43rd Annual Grammy Awards are presented in Los Angeles, hosted by Jon Stewart. Several artists win three awards each: Steely Dan (who win Album of the Year for Two Against Nature), U2 (who win both Record of the Year and Song of the Year for "Beautiful Day"), Dr. Dre, Eminem and Faith Hill. Shelby Lynne wins Best New Artist. 
February 28 – Courtney Love sues to get out of her contract with Vivendi Universal, on the grounds that music industry contracts are unfairly long compared to those in other industries.

March
March 1 – Collin Raye is awarded the Artist Humanitarian Award from Country Radio Broadcasters. The award was given in recognition of Raye's work on behalf of a number of different charitable organizations including Childhelp USA, USA Weekend's Make A Difference Day and the Native American organization Hecel Oyakapi.
March 8 – Melanie C announces she does not intend to do any more work with the Spice Girls. Although the group denies it is splitting, it would not be active again until 2007.
March 9
Janet Jackson's single "All for You" becomes the first song to be added to every station in three mainstream radio formats within its first week of release. It was also the highest debut for a single not commercially available in both the United States and France. 
Eric Singer replaces Peter Criss as the drummer for Kiss as the band continues its farewell tour in Yokohama, Japan. Singer dons the "Catman" make-up, ending the band's tradition of creating new make-up and personas for replacement members.
March 13 – Janet Jackson is honored as the first ever MTV Icon. The televised tribute became the highest rated show of the night.
March 14 – The Court of Appeals in Rome finds Michael Jackson "not guilty" of plagiarism, reversing a decision made in 1999 by a lower court. Italian songwriter Albano Carrisi had claimed that Jackson's "Will You Be There" was a copy of his song "I Cigni Di Balaka."
March 16 – Sean "Puffy" Combs is acquitted on all charges stemming from a December 1999 nightclub shooting in Manhattan. However, an artist on his Bad Boy Records label, Shyne, is convicted of two counts of assault as well as reckless endangerment and gun possession.
March 20 – Toadies release Hell Below/Stars Above, the band's first album in nearly seven years. The band announces irts break-up five months later.
March 24 – John Connolly of Sevendust marries Lori Kirkley.
March 26
 Gorillaz release their first studio album Gorillaz. The album reached number three in the UK, and was an unexpected hit in the US, hitting number 14 and selling over seven million copies worldwide by 2007. It earned the group an entry in the Guinness Book of World Records as the Most Successful Virtual Band. 
 Aerosmith release their thirteenth studio album, Just Push Play, charting at No. 2 in the US Billboard 200.
March 28
Sergei Rachmaninoff's Piano Concerto No. 2 replaces Max Bruch's violin concerto at #1 in the Classic FM Hall of Fame.
Two big selling albums : Hikaru Utada's Distance and Ayumi Hamasaki's A Best are released on exactly the same date. Their debut week sales are 3,002,720 and 2,874,870, respectively, setting the world's #1 and #2 one-week album sales records.
March 31 – Couple Whitney Houston and Bobby Brown were thrown out and banned for life from Hollywood's Bel Air Hotel and arrested and jailed after destroying their room. Property that was allegedly damaged included a TV and two doors. According to hotel workers, the walls and carpets were also stained by alcohol. The hotel closed down the room for five days for repairs.

April–May
April 3 – Mariah Carey signs a blockbuster contract with Virgin Records, worth $80 million for four albums.
April 4 – Original Zombies lead singer Colin Blunstone and keyboardist Rod Argent reunite for a two-part performance at London's Jazz Cafe, the first time the two had performed together in over 30 years.
April 14 – Janet Jackson's "All for You" reaches number one on the Billboard Hot 100 and remains atop the chart for seven consecutive weeks. It becomes the longest reigning hit of the year. 
April 15 – The Dutch DJ Tiësto releases his first solo album, In My Memory, on Black Hole Recordings.
April 21 – The first Top Chinese Music Awards ceremony is held.
April 24 – Janet Jackson releases her seventh studio album, All for You. It becomes her fifth consecutive album to open at number one, with sales exceeding 600,000 copies. It receives three Grammy Award nominations, winning for Best Dance Recording.
April 28 – The second Coachella Valley Music and Arts Festival takes place in California as a single-day event. Headlined by Jane's Addiction, the lineup also features Weezer, The Roots, Gang Starr, Iggy Pop, The Orb, The Dandy Warhols and Mos Def.
May 1 
Huey Lewis and the News makes a comeback with their album Plan B, their first album of new material in a decade.
The 4th EJCF is held in Basel. The next time was in 2004.
May 12 – Joey Fatone of 'N Sync injures his leg in a trap door during rehearsals for the new tour.
The 46th Eurovision Song Contest, held at Parken Stadium in Copenhagen, Denmark, is won by Tanel Padar and Dave Benton, backed by hip hop group 2XL. They represented Estonia with the song "Everybody", marking the first victory for one of the Baltic states and one of the former Soviet republics. At 50 years old, Benton also becomes the oldest contestant, as well as the first black person, to win Eurovision.
May 15
 Charley Pride's A Tribute to Jim Reeves is the first compact disc to have copy protection.
 '80s band The Go Go's release their first album in 17 years: God Bless The Go Go's
May 22 – Mötley Crüe publishes their collective autobiography The Dirt.

June
June 1 – Christina Aguilera scores her fourth number one single on the Billboard Hot 100 for Lady Marmalade a collaboration with Lil' Kim, Mýa, and Pink. The video wins the MTV Video Music Award for Video of the Year.
June 5
Radiohead releases their 5th studio album, "Amnesiac"
Drowning Pool releases their 1st studio album, "Sinner". After the 9/11 attacks, the single "Bodies" is put on the list of songs deemed inappropriate by Clear Channel.
June 9 – Madonna kicks off her first concert tour in 8 years, the Drowned World Tour, in Barcelona, Spain.
June 12 
Blink-182 release their fourth studio album Take Off Your Pants And Jacket which would later sell 14 million copies worldwide. This was the band's second successful album. 
Electric Light Orchestra release Zoom, their first album in 15 years.
June 15 – Bad Religion drummer Bobby Schayer, who had been with the band since 1991, is forced to give up music after experiencing a "most unfortunate career-ending injury". This leads to his leaving Bad Religion for good; he is replaced by current drummer Brooks Wackerman. By this time, Bad Religion were dropped from Atlantic Records and had returned to their original label Epitaph, and founding guitarist Brett Gurewitz had just rejoined the band after a 7-year hiatus.
June 16 – The Los Angeles radio station KROQ-FM airs the 9th Annual of the Weenie Roast show with Blink-182, Coldplay, Crazy Town, The Cult, Disturbed, Jane's Addiction, Linkin Park, The Living End, New Found Glory, Pennywise, Papa Roach, Stabbing Westward, Staind, Stone Temple Pilots, Sum 41 and 311.
June 24 – Jazz pianist John Hicks marries flautist Elise Wood.

July
July 2 
Willy Denzey makes his first appearance at Les Francofolies de La Rochelle.
Napster shuts down its entire network in order to comply with a court injunction ordering it to halt the trading of copyrighted files.
July 7 – Janet Jackson begins her All for You Tour.
July 9 – Backstreet Boys put their Black & Blue summer tour on hold to allow A. J. McLean to enter a rehabilitation facility to deal with alcoholism and depression.
July 10 – Dream Street releases their debut album, Dream Street
July 16 – Mariah Carey releases "Loverboy"; it eventually became the best-selling song of 2001.
July 17 – Aaliyah releases her third studio album Aaliyah.
July 17–22 – The fourth Yoyo A Go Go punk and indie rock festival opens in Olympia, Washington.
July 19 – Ol' Dirty Bastard is sentenced to 2 to 4 years in prison for drug possession.
July 21 – The first annual Splendour in the Grass music festival is held in Byron Bay, New South Wales, headlined by Powderfinger.
July 24 – NSYNC releases their third studio album, Celebrity.
July 25 – Mariah Carey checks into a hospital for what a spokesperson terms "extreme exhaustion". Carey had exhibited several incidents of bizarre behavior during the previous week, including performing a strange striptease during an unscheduled visit to MTV's Total Request Live and posting a rambling message on her website in which she wrote, "I don't know what's going on with life".
July 30 – The Strokes release their debut album Is This It.

August
August 3 – Whitney Houston signs the largest contract in music history with Arista Records, a six-album deal worth over $100 million.
August 6 – Death Row Records founder Suge Knight is released from prison after serving five years of a nine-year sentence for a parole violation.
August 7 – Aaron Carter comes back with his third studio album (second under Jive Records) Oh Aaron.
August 13 – Two weeks before its official release, Spider One of Powerman 5000 pulls Anyone for Doomsday? off the market because it sounds too much like their previous release Tonight the Stars Revolt!. Later he releases the album on their website. Two months later, Al 3 & Dorian 27 leave the band.
August 15 – Wilco signs a buy-out deal with Reprise Records after the label rejects the Yankee Hotel Foxtrot album and the band refuses to make any changes. Wilco leaves with the rights to the album in their possession.
August 25 – A Cessna 402 carrying 9 people, including R&B singer Aaliyah, crashes in the Bahamas, killing all aboard.

September
September 4 – The second studio album from American band System of a Down, Toxicity, is released worldwide. After the 9/11 attacks, the single "Chop Suey!" is put on the list of songs deemed inappropriate by Clear Channel.
September 5 – A performance of John Cage's As Slow as Possible on a specially-built organ in Sankt-Burchardi-Church in Halberstadt, Germany, scheduled to last until the year 2640 begins with an 18-month pause.
September 6  – At the 2001 MTV Video Music Awards, Britney Spears performs her new single I'm a Slave 4 U in a very revealing outfit and featuring a number of exotic animals including a white and live albino Burmese python on her shoulder, leading to a great deal of criticism from animal rights organisation PETA. Nevertheless, MTV named the performance as the most memorable moment in VMA history.
September 7-10  – The Michael Jackson: 30th Anniversary Special tribute concerts are held at Madison Square Garden in New York City.
September 10 – Blink-182 start shooting a video for "Stay Together for the Kids", featuring the band playing in a derelict house. When they try to finish the video the following day, the 9–11 attacks on the World Trade Center in New York City occur, and the band abandon the attempt and decide to shoot a different video for the song.
September 11 – 
Bob Dylan's Love and Theft album was released on this day. 
The September 11 attacks result in the cancellation or postponement of many musical events, due to the halting of many commercial flights and the somber mood of communities around the world:
MTV and VH1 suspend regular programming to carry a newsfeed from CBS, and the 2001 Latin Grammy Awards broadcast is canceled. 
Sting, who had planned to stream a performance in Italy on the Internet, reduces the Webcast to one song, "Fragile". 
Enya's "Only Time" becomes backdrop for CNN. 
The MuchMusic Video Awards scheduled for September 23 are also canceled.
Gerard Way witnesses the attacks and is inspired to start a band, which later becomes My Chemical Romance.
Mariah Carey releases her infamous soundtrack Glitter accompanied by the unsuccessful movie. The soundtrack's lead single, Loverboy, reaches no. 2 on the Billboard Hot 100.
September 14 – Clear Channel Communications issues a controversial memorandum to its radio stations containing a list of 165 songs considered "lyrically questionable" in the aftermath of the September 11 attacks. The list includes "Knockin' on Heaven's Door", all songs by Rage Against the Machine and John Lennon's "Imagine".
September 21 – America: A Tribute to Heroes airs uninterrupted on all major networks. The solemn concert, only 10 days after the September 11 attacks, included performances by Bruce Springsteen, Tom Petty, Celine Dion, Neil Young, Stevie Wonder, Alicia Keys, Dave Matthews, Faith Hill, Mariah Carey, and others.
September 25 – XM Satellite Radio is launched.
September 29
The First International Accordion Festival begins at La Villita in San Antonio, Texas, celebrating the multicultural traditions of the accordion with artists performing German, Colombian, Irish, Argentinian tango, Cajun-zydeco, Dominican merengue and conjunto-Tejano music.
Jennifer Lopez weds back-up dancer Cris Judd. The marriage would end in June 2002.

October
October 2 – Machine Head release their fourth studio album Supercharger.
October 6 
Burton C. Bell gets into a fight with his bandmate Dino Cazares about a manager they fired. The event triggers the demise of Fear Factory.
Pop Idol premieres on ITV.
October 9 – The first CD in the Kidz Bop series, consisting of Top 40 hits sung by children, is released.
October 10 – Heavy metal band Anthrax issues a press release in response to the 2001 anthrax attacks jokingly stating that they will be changing the name of the group to "Basket Full of Puppies". It concludes, "we don't want to change the name of the band, not because it would be a pain in the ass, but because we hope that no further negative events will happen and it won't be necessary. We hope and pray that this problem goes away quietly and we all grow old and fat together." The band has reported increased traffic to their website due to Internet users going to anthrax.com looking for information about the disease.
October 12 – Wes Borland leaves Limp Bizkit.
October 16 – Michael Jackson releases special editions of his albums Off the Wall, Thriller, Bad and Dangerous, to celebrate his thirtieth anniversary as a solo musician.
October 20
The Concert for New York City airs on VH1, with performances by Paul McCartney, The Rolling Stones, Bon Jovi, The Who, Billy Joel and others.
Volunteers For America benefit concert is held in Atlanta, MC was Drew Carey with performances by Edgar Winter Group, Mark Farner, Jack Blades, John Waite, The Knack, Eddie Money, Peter Frampton, Survivor, Kansas, Journey, Styx, REO Speedwagon, Bad Company, Lynyrd Skynyrd, and others.
October 21
United We Stand: What More Can I Give benefit concert is held at RFK Stadium in Washington, D.C., with performances by Michael Jackson, Aerosmith, Mariah Carey, James Brown, Backstreet Boys, 'N Sync, and others.
Volunteers For America benefit concert is held at Smirnoff Music Centre in Dallas, Texas, MC was Drew Carey with performances by Edgar Winter Group, Mark Farner, Jack Blades, John Waite, The Knack, Eddie Money, Peter Frampton, Survivor, Kansas, Journey, Styx, REO Speedwagon, Bad Company, and others.
October 23
The Backstreet Boys release their first compilation album The Hits: Chapter One.
The first iPod is released by Apple Inc.
Incubus releases their third full-length major label album entitled Morning View. It debuted on the Billboard Top 200 at the #2 spot (266,000 copies were sold in its first week). This was the highest ever placement for Incubus. At the same time, "Wish You Were Here" was at #2 on the Modern Rock Charts, and "Drive" sat at #48 on the Hot 100 chart.
October 25 – Quarashi performs a live concert with the Iceland Symphony Orchestra (the band Botnleðja also performed) in the Háskólabíó in Reykjavík, Iceland, which is notable for being the first time that a rap act performed a live concert with the Iceland Symphony Orchestra. Quarashi perform seven songs from their upcoming album, Jinx.
October 30 – Michael Jackson releases Invincible, his first studio album since 1995 and his tenth studio album overall. While the album debuts at number one, its success is limited due to a feud between Jackson and Sony Music Entertainment over the rights to his back-catalog, culminating in Jackson accusing the company of racial discrimination. The album would end up being Jackson's last, with later musical efforts being offset by a second series of child molestation allegations in 2003, a trial over said allegations in 2005, and his death on the eve of a comeback tour in June 2009.
October 31 – Britney Spears releases her third studio album Britney.

November–December
November 1 
The governing body of the UK Singles Chart, Chart Information Network Ltd. (CIN), changes its name to The Official UK Charts Company.
Britney Spears starts her Dream Within a Dream Tour, in support her self-titled third studio album. The tour was accompanied by many extravagant special effect including a water screen that pumped two tons of water into the stage during the encore. The tour was commercial success, all the venues on the 2001 leg are largely sold out and grossed $43.7 million from 68 show.
November 5 – In the UK, BMG becomes the first major label to release a compact disc with copy protection, Natalie Imbruglia's White Lilies Island. Within two weeks BMG announces they will re-issue the disc without the copy protection, due to complaints from consumers who were unable to play the CDs in their personal computers.
November 6
Britney Spears' third album, Britney debuts at #1, making her the first female artist to have her first three albums enter the US charts at #1.
 Nu-Metal Band Dope release their second studio album Life.
The soundtrack album of the Nickelodeon movie Jimmy Neutron: Boy Genius is released.
December 1  – Mike Turner quits Our Lady Peace.
December 4 – Gospel music singer Yolanda Adams releases her eighth studio album Believe.
December 12  – Surviving Nirvana members Krist Novoselic and Dave Grohl sue Courtney Love in an effort to oust her from the board controlling the management of the band's affairs, calling her "irrational, mercurial, self-centered, unmanageable, inconsistent and unpredictable." The legal battle over the band's legacy has blocked the release of a planned Nirvana box set containing the unreleased track "You Know You're Right".

Also in 2001
Area One music festival brings together a variety of acts including Moby, Incubus, Outkast, New Order, Nelly Furtado, The Roots, Rinocerose, Paul Oakenfold, and Carl Cox.
The Republic of France awards Jean-Yves Thibaudet the honour of Chevalier de l'Ordre des Arts et des Lettres.
Deporitaz releases Microwave this CD, his second album, on MP3.com.
Sean Beasley joins Dying Fetus.

Bands formed
See Musical groups established in 2001

Bands disbanded
See Musical groups disestablished in 2001

Bands reformed
 Army of Lovers
 Devourment
 Electric Light Orchestra (with new members except for original members, Jeff Lynne and Richard Tandy)
 Level 42
 The Monkees
 Maroon 5
 Roxy Music
 Zebra
 Sunny Day Real Estate

Albums released

January–March

April–June

July–September

October–December

Release date unknown
5 Songs – The Decemberists
Against Me! – Against Me!
At Dawn – My Morning Jacket
Breaking Benjamin – Breaking Benjamin
Don't Be Frightened of Turning the Page – Bright Eyes
Feel No Fade – Push Kings
First Album – Miss Kittin & The Hacker
A Melody of Retreads and Broken Quills – Filthy Thieving Bastards
On the Edge – Iron Fire 
Polen – Lynda Thomas
Songs For A Small Room – Fantastic Something
Twilight – The Handsome Family
Undone – Brian & Jenn Johnson
Yule Ritual – Hawkwind

Top 5 Selling Albums of Billboard Year
 Hybrid Theory – Linkin Park
 1 – The Beatles
 Invincible – Michael Jackson
 All That You Can't Leave Behind – U2
 Aaliyah – Aaliyah

Top 10 Best Selling Albums 2001 (Soundscan)
 Hybrid Theory / Linkin Park ~ 4,810,000
 Hot Shot / Shaggy ~ 4,520,000
 Celebrity / NSYNC ~ 4,420,000
 A Day Without Rain / Enya ~ 4,410,000
 Break the Cycle / Staind ~ 4,240,000
 Songs in A Minor / Alicia Keys ~ 4,100,000
 Survivor / Destiny's Child ~ 3,720,000
 Weathered / Creed ~ 3,580,000
 O Brother, Where Art Thou? Soundtrack ~ 3,460,000
 Now That's What I Call Music! 6 ~ 3,130,000

Popular songs

Classical music
 John Adams –
American Berserk, for piano
Nancy's Fancy, for ensemble
 Louis Andriessen –
Passeggiata in tram in America e ritorno, for female Italian voice, 3 trumpets, 3 trombones, electric guitar, electric violin, double bass, piano, and percussion
De vleugels van de herinnering, for voice and piano
Fanfare om te beginnen, for sx groups of horns
 Georges Aperghis –
Le petit chaperon rouge, for chamber ensemble
Rasch, for violin and viola
 Milton Babbitt – A Lifetime or So, for tenor and piano
 Leonardo Balada – Cello Concerto No. 2 New Orleans
 Osvaldas Balakauskas – Symphony No. 5
 Gerald Barry –
Dead March, for large ensemble
God Save the Queen, for solo boy's voice, choir, and large ensemble
Snow is White, for piano quartet
String Quartet No. 3 (Six Marches)
 George Benjamin – Shadowlines, for piano
 Luciano Berio – Sonata, for piano
 Christophe Bertrand –
Dikha, for clarinet/bass clarinet and electronics
Ektra, for solo flute
Full, for four vibraphones, piano, and eight amplified voices
 Frank Michael Beyer – Klangtore, for orchestra
 Harrison Birtwistle –
Fanfare, for brass and percussion
Saraband, for piano
The Shadow of Night, for orchestra
Tenebrae David, for brass ensemble
 Pierre Boulez – Incises, for piano (revised version)
 Elliott Carter
Concerto for Cello and Orchestra
Figment II, for cello
Hiyoku, for two clarinets
Quartet, for oboe, violin, viola, and cello
Steep Steps, for bass clarinet
 Anna Clyne – 
Arclight, for tape
Manipura, for chamber ensemble
One, for tape
Wish, for voice or voices
 John Corigliano – Symphony No. 2 for String Orchestra
 George Crumb – Unto the Hills for soprano, percussion quartet and piano
 Peter Maxwell Davies – Symphony No. 8 (Antarctic Symphony)
 Alexandra du Bois – 
Júdica Me, for a cappella chorus
Preludes to Solitude, for guitar
String Quintet: A Requiem for the Living for two violins, viola and two double basses
Songs (4), for mezzo-soprano and orchestra
 Joël-François Durand – Athanor for orchestra
 Péter Eötvös – Snatches of a Conversation, for ensemble
 Brian Ferneyhough –
In nomine à 3, for piccolo, oboe, and clarinet
Stelae for Failed Time, for 12 voices and live electronics
 Lorenzo Ferrero
Two Cathedrals in the South concertino for trumpet and orchestra
Moonlight Sonata for five percussion instruments
 Michael Finnissy – The History of Photography in Sound
 Alexandra Fol –
Concerto for violin and orchestra
Requiem No. 1, for chorus and orchestra, Op. 19
 Joep Franssens – Harmony of the spheres, for mixed choir and string orchestra
 Frans Geysen –
City of Smiles, twenty solos for one recorder player, playing soprano to bass
Ehrung an M.C.E. (E=mc2), for alto recorder
Met vel, rand en tand, for three percussionists
Met zijn twaalven, for twelve recorders
Möbiusband 15, for string quartet
Op de fles, for four players on 16 bottles
 Philip Glass – Concerto, for cello and orchestra 
 Friedrich Goldmann –
Concerto a 8 (Octet), for two oboes, two clarinets, two horns, and two bassoons
Drei Strophen, for clarinet and violin
Study, for two pianos
Tombeau (in memoriam Iannis Xenakis), for bass clarinet, bassoon, trombone, piano, viola, and cello
 Howard Goodall – In Memoriam Anne Frank
Georg Friedrich Haas
Blumenstück
De terrae fine, for violin solo
Flow and Friction, for sixteenth-tone piano four-hands
Sodass ich's hernach mit einem Blick gleichsam wie ein schönes Bild... im Geist
Übersehe
 Jeff Hamburg – Aychah, for choir and orchestra
 Jonathan Harvey – The Summer Cloud's Awakening, for choir, flute, cello, and electronics 
 York Höller
Ex tempore, for flute, oboe, clarinet (doubling bass clarinet), percussion, violin, viola, cello, harp, and piano
Trias, for alto saxophone, percussion, and piano
Der ewige Tag, for chorus, orchestra, and electronics
 Mauricio Kagel – Piano Trio No. 2
 Wojciech Kilar – Fanfare for the Society of Polish Surgeons
 Helmut Lachenmann – Grido (string quartet)
 György Ligeti –Études, Book 3, for piano
 James MacMillan –
The Birds of Rhiannon, for orchestra with optional chorus
O Bone Jesu, for SSAATTBB choir with soli
 Robin Maconie – Songs for The Caucasian Chalk Circle (15), after Brecht
 Frederik Magle – The Hope for brass band, choir, organ and percussion.
 Mesías Maiguashca – La noche cíclica, for violin, cello, piano, marimba, and 4 envelope followers
 Tomás Marco – Laberinto marino, for cello and orchestra
 Anna Mikhailova –
Sonata for piano
Songs (4), for baritone and piano
 Stuart Mitchell – Seven Wonders Suite, for choir and orchestra
 Onutė Narbutaitė – Symphony No. 2
 Olga Neuwirth –
Ecstaloop, for soprano, speaker, sampler, and ensemble
Incidental music for Abenteuer in Sachen Haut, after Dylan Thomas, by Peter Carp
Locus...doublure...solus, for piano and orchestra (or chamber ensemble)
 Michael Obst – 
Piano Trio No. 1
Transit, for orchestra
 Henri Pousseur –
Berceuses (4), for unaccompanied voice or unison choir
Eclipticare, ou les périples constellés, for one, two, or three instruments, surrounded or not, each a "consort"
Sursauts, for violin (doubling viola), trombone, and piano
 Jaime Reis – Estátua de Pessanha, piano, bass flute, and real-time video
 Wolfgang Rihm –
Jagden und Formen, for chamber orchestra
Sechs Gedichte von Friedrich Nietzsche, for voice and piano
 Peter Ruzicka – Trans – Requiem für Giuseppe Sinopoli
 Vahram Sargsyan – Luys Zvart [Joyful Light], for female chorus
 Bright Sheng –
Distant Birthday Bells, for piano
Tibetan Dance, for violin, clarinet, and piano
 Stuart Saunders Smith –
And Cold for xylophone/narrator
Breath for mezzo-soprano and orchestra bells (glockenspiel)
Family Portraits: Ligeia (Daughter) for soprano voice and piano
Light Dew for solo double bass
Madness for xylophone/narrator
Minor for solo violin
Pond for xylophone/narrator
Sometime Then for xylophone/narrator
 Juan María Solare –
Les atavismes du crépuscule [Atavisms of twilight], for clarinet, alto saxophone, and trombone
Blind Date, for two bass clarinets (with theatral elements)
Blues en mí [Blues in E / Blues in Me], for piano
Fastango for piano
Icarus, for flute, clarinet, violin, cello, and piano
 Pasaje Seaver, tango for piano
 RED: A Deconstructed Blues (Music for Marcel Worms) for piano
 Winchmore Hill for piano
 Karlheinz Stockhausen – Stop und Start, for six instrumental groups, Nr. 18
 Dennis Tobenski –
The Passionate Shepherd to His Love, for mixed choir
Three Poems of Thomas Hardy, for voice and piano
 Stephen Truelove –
Broken Song, for solo horn
Preludium and Chakratour, for string quartet
Three Songs to Poems by Frank Anderton, for soprano and piano
 Michel van der Aa – Here [to Be Found], for soprano, chamber orchestra, and soundtrack
 Kevin Volans –
Concerto for Double Orchestra
Zeno at 4 am, theatre piece for shadow puppets, actors, bass, string quartet, and chorus
 Dafina Zeqiri – 
Dialog for violin and piano
My Mother for mixed chorus
 Walter Zimmermann –
Clinamen I–IV, for six orchestral groups
La fleur Inverse, for organ
Schatten der Ideen 6, 'Blaupause''', for pianoDie Sorge geht über den Fluss, for solo violinUmbræ Idearum (Schatten der Ideen 4), for piano and string quartet
 Ellen Taaffe Zwillich – OpeningsOpera
 Jason Kao Hwang – The Floating Box: A Story in Chinatown Theo Loevendie – Johnny & Jones Sven-David Sandström – Jeppe: The Cruel Comedy David Sawer – From Morning to Midnight Michel van der Aa – VuurJazz

Musical theater
 Atgof o'r Sêr – first performed by Bryn Terfel and Cor Rhuthun in north Wales. Commissioned for the National Eisteddfod of Wales at Denbigh.
 A Class Act – Broadway production opened at the Ambassador Theatre on March 11 and ran for 105 performances
 42nd Street – Broadway revival opened at the Ford Center on May 2
 Mamma Mia! – Broadway production opened at the Winter Garden Theatre on October 18 and ran for 5773 performances.  It was the eighth longest run in Broadway musical history.
 The Producers – Broadway production opened at St. James Theatre on April 19 and ran for 2502 performances.  The show won a record twelve Tony Awards.
 Urinetown – Broadway production opened at the Hudson Theatre on September 20 and ran for 965 performances

Musical films
 Beijing Rocks Carmen: A Hip Hopera Gadar: Ek Prem Katha, starring Sunny Deol, Amisha Patel and Amrish Puri
 Glitter released September 21, starring Mariah Carey and Max Beesley
 Hedwig and the Angry Inch, directed by and starring John Cameron Mitchell
 Love You Hamesha, starring Akshaye Khanna and Sonali Bendre
 Moulin Rouge! released May 18, starring Nicole Kidman and Ewan McGregor
 On the Road to Emmaus, starring Peter Franzén
 One Night the Moon, starring Paul Kelly and Kaarin Fairfax
 Rebelové, starring Zuzana Norisová and Tomáš Hanák
 Rock Star ScratchBirths
January 1 – Winter, South Korean singer and dancer (aespa)
January 8 – Kaash Paige, American singer-songwriter
January 18 – Thomas Raggi, Italian guitarist (Måneskin)
January 21 – Griff, British singer
February 8 – Jxdn, American singer-songwriter
March 3 - Jvke, American singer-songwriter, producer, and social media personality.
March 8 – Zhavia Ward, American singer, songwriter, musician
March 9 – Jeon Somi, Canadian singer
March 31 – Noah Urrea, American singer (Now United)
April 10 – Noa kirel, Israeli singer
April 30 – Lil Tjay, American rapper
April 17 – Ryujin, South Korean singer and dancer (ITZY)
April 16 - PinkPantheress, English singer-songwriter and record producer 
May 9 – Bandokay, British rapper
May 15 – Kevin Kaarl, Mexican singer and producer
May 17 – AJ Mitchell, American singer
May 18 – Breskvica, Serbian singer
June 1 – ppcocaine, American rapper
June 3 - Reyanna Maria, Filipino-Australian singer, rapper, and songwriter
June 5 – Chaeryeong, South Korean singer and dancer (ITZY)
 3 August – Tiago PZK, Argentine rapper
 7 August – Ryusei Ohnishi, Japanese singer and actor (Naniwa Danshi)
 27 August – May-a, Australian singer-songwriter 
September 6 – Laprete, American singer, producer and musician
September 23
J.I., American rapper and songwriter
Tiara Andini, Indonesian singer
October 22 – Jo Yuri, South Korean singer
October 30 – Bella Paige, Australian singer
November 22 – Chenle, Chinese singer and songwriter (NCT Dream)
December 1 – Elias Abbas, Swedish singer
December 18 – Billie Eilish, American singer, dancer, musician, activist and songwriter.

Deaths
January 4 – Les Brown, bandleader (89)
January 5 – Milan Hlavsa, Czech musician (Plastic People of the Universe) (49)
January 7 – James Carr, soul singer (58)
January 10 – Bryan Gregory, guitarist (The Cramps)(49)
January 24 – Leif Thybo, Danish composer and organist (78)
February 4
J.J. Johnson, jazz bebop trombonist (77)
Iannis Xenakis, Greek composer (78)
February 7 – Dale Evans, American singer-songwriter and actress (88)
February 10 – Buddy Tate, jazz musician (87)
February 13 – George T. Simon, music critic and original Glenn Miller Orchestra drummer (pneumonia)
February 19 – Charles Trenet French singer and songwriter (87)
February 21
Ronnie Hilton, English singer (75)
Malcolm Yelvington, rockabilly musician (82)
February 22 – John Fahey, guitarist, indie label owner (61)
March 4 – Glenn Hughes, The Village People (50)
 March 9 – Richard Stone, American composer (47)
March 12 – Sir Lancelot, calypso singer (98)
March 18 – John Phillips, singer-songwriter, co-founder of The Mamas & the Papas (65)
March 20 – Francis Grasso, disc jockey (51)
March 28 – Moe Koffman, Canadian jazz singer (73)
March 29 – John Lewis, jazz pianist (80)
April 6 – Charles Pettigrew, of Charles & Eddie (37) (cancer)
April 9 – Graziella Sciutti, operatic soprano (73)
April 11
Sandy Bull, folk musician (60)
Graciela Naranjo, bolero singer and actress (84)
Sir Harry Secombe, entertainer (79)
April 15 – Joey Ramone, lead singer of The Ramones (49) (lymphoma)
April 20 – Giuseppe Sinopoli, composer and conductor (54)(heart attack)
May 3 – Billy Higgins, jazz drummer (64)
May 5 – Boozoo Chavis, zydeco musician (70)
May 10 – James E. Myers, songwriter ("Rock Around the Clock") (81)
May 12 – Perry Como, American crooner (88)
May 16 – Prince Ital Joe, reggae singer (38) (car accident)
May 20 – Renato Carosone, Italian musician and singer (81)
June 4 – John Hartford, bluegrass musician (64)
June 7 – Carole Fredericks, singer
June 13 – Marcelo Fromer, guitarist for Brazilian band Titãs (39) (rammed by a motorcycle)
June 18 – Davorin Popović, lead singer for Bosnian band Indexi (55)
June 21 – John Lee Hooker, blues musician (88)
June 30
Chet Atkins, country musician (77)
Joe Henderson, jazz saxophonist (64)
July 3
Delia Derbyshire, English electronic composer (64)
Johnny Russell, American singer-songwriter and guitarist (61)
July 5 – Ernie K-Doe, R & B singer (65)
July 7 – Fred Neil, folk singer-songwriter (65)
July 15 – Anthony Ian Berkeley, rapper (Brothers Grym, Gravediggaz) (36) (colon cancer)
July 18 – Mimi Fariña, singer-songwriter (56) (neuroendocrine cancer)
July 23 – Richie Lee, singer and bassist (Acetone)(34)(suicide)
July 27
Harold Land, hard bop saxophonist (73)
Leon Wilkeson, bassist for Lynyrd Skynyrd (49)
August 2 – Ronald Townson, American singer and actor (The 5th Dimension) (68)
August 6 – Larry Adler, harmonica virtuoso (86)
August 18 – Roland Cardon, Belgian composer and multi-instrumentalist (72)
August 25 – Aaliyah, American singer, model, dancer and actress (22)(plane crash)
August 27 – Karl Ulrich Schnabel, pianist (92)
August 29 – Graeme "Shirley" Strachan, lead singer of Skyhooks (49)
September 1 – Ted Mulry, lead singer with Ted Mulry Gang (54)
September 6 – Carl Crack, techno musician (Atari Teenage Riot)(30)
September 22 – Isaac Stern, violinist (81)
October 3 – Tatiana Menotti, operatic soprano (92)
October 5 – Ivan Hrušovský, Slovak composer (74)
October 10 – Barry McCauley, operatic tenor (51)(lung cancer)
October 17 – Jay Livingston, songwriter (86)
November 17 – Michael Karoli, guitarist, violinist and composer (53)(cancer)
November 21 – Ralph Burns, American songwriter, bandleader, composer, conductor, arranger and bebop pianist (79)
November 24 – Melanie Thornton, singer (La Bouche) (34)(air crash)
November 28 – Kal Mann, American lyricist ("Teddy Bear", "Butterfly")(84)
November 29 – George Harrison, musician and former member of The Beatles (58)(lung cancer)
December 13 – Chuck Schuldiner, vocalist and guitarist with Death (34)(cancer)
December 15 – Rufus Thomas, singer (84)
December 16 – Stuart Adamson, guitarist with Big Country (43)(suicide)
December 17 – Débria Brown, operatic soprano (65)
December 18 – Gilbert Bécaud, singer-songwriter (74)
December 22 – Norman Granz, American producer (83)
December 29 – Cássia Eller, Brazilian singer (39)

Awards
 The following artists are inducted into the Rock and Roll Hall of Fame: Aerosmith, Solomon Burke, The Flamingos, Michael Jackson, Queen, Paul Simon, Steely Dan and Ritchie Valens
 Inductees of the GMA Gospel Music Hall of Fame include Larry Norman, and Elvis Presley

ARIA Music Awards
 ARIA Music Awards of 2001

Country Music Association Awards
 2001 Country Music Association Awards

Grammy Awards
 Grammy Awards of 2001

Juno Awards
 Juno Awards of 2001
 March 4 – Bruce Cockburn is inducted into the Canadian Music Hall of Fame

Eurovision Song Contest
 Eurovision Song Contest 2001

Mercury Music Prize
 Stories from the City, Stories from the Sea'' – PJ Harvey wins.

MTV Video Music Awards
 2001 MTV Video Music Awards

See also
 :Category:Record labels established in 2001

References

 
2001-related lists
Music-related lists
Music by year